The Cure is the 6th studio recording release by Irish rock band The Saw Doctors. The CD was released on The Saw Doctor's own record label, Shamtown Records and has the catalogue number of SAWDOC013CD. All the songs on the album are original songs written by members of the band, except for Track 11, "Funny World", which is written by old friend Paul Cunniffe.

Track listing
All songs written by Leo Moran / Davy Carton except as indicated.

"Out for a Smoke"
"Last Summer in New York"
"Addicted"
"Stars Over Cloughanover"
"If Only"
"Wisdom of Youth"
"Vulnerable"
"Me Without You"
"Going Home" (L. Moran / Carton / Padraig Stevens / Derek Murray)
"Your Guitar" (L. Moran / Carton / Jimmy Moran)
"Funny World" (Paul Cunniffe)
"I'll Say Goodnight"

Personnel

Band
Davy Carton: Vocals, Guitar
Leo Moran: Guitar, Backing Vocals
Fran Breen: Drums
Anthony Thistlethwaite: Bass guitar, Harmonica, Saxophone
Derek Murray: Keyboards

Guest musicians
Nicola Geddes: Cello
Kenneth Rice: Violin
Giles Packham: Piano, Synthesizers, Programming
Paul Barrett: Backing Vocals
Jimmy Moran: Guitar
Christopher Carton: Percussion
Niall O'Grady: Guitar
Eamonn Goggin: Bell, Shaker

External links
The Saw Doctors Official Website

The Saw Doctors albums
2005 albums